Trumbull manuscripts may refer to:
The manuscript collection of David Trumbull (1819–1889) at Princeton Theological Seminary
The manuscript collection of William Trumbull (1639–1716) at the British Library  
The manuscript collection of Benjamin Trumbull (1735–1820) at the Yale Library